Amarillo Wranglers may refer to:

 Amarillo Wranglers (1968–1971), minor professional hockey team, affiliate of the Pittsburgh Penguins of the National Hockey League
 Amarillo Wranglers (1975–1977), minor professional ice hockey team in the Southwest Hockey League
 Amarillo Wranglers (NAHL), junior ice hockey team in the North American Hockey League